The 1894 United States elections was held on November 6, and elected the members of the 54th United States Congress. These were mid-term elections during Democratic President Grover Cleveland's second term. The Republican landslide of 1894 marked a realigning election In American politics as the nation moved from the Third Party System that had focused on issues of civil war and reconstruction, and entered the Fourth Party System, known as the Progressive Era, which focused on middle class reforms.

The Democrats suffered a landslide defeat in the House losing over 100 seats to the Republicans in the single largest swing in the history of the House. The Democrats also lost four seats in the Senate, thus resulting in the President's party completely losing control of both houses of Congress, the first time this ever happened in a midterm election.

The Democratic Party losses can be traced largely to the Panic of 1893 and the ineffective party leadership of Cleveland. Republicans effectively used the issues of the tariff, bimetallism, and the Cuban War of Independence against Cleveland. The Democrats suffered huge defeats outside the South (almost ninety percent of Northeastern and Midwestern House Democrats lost re-election), and the Democratic Party underwent a major turnover in party leadership. With the defeat of many Bourbon Democrats, William Jennings Bryan took the party in a more populist direction starting with the 1896 elections.

Federal 
1894 United States House of Representatives elections
1894–95 United States Senate elections

States 
1894 South Carolina gubernatorial election
1894 Pennsylvania gubernatorial election

See also
1892 United States presidential election
1892 United States House of Representatives elections
1892–93 United States Senate elections

References

Further reading
 
 Lewis, J. Eugene. "The Tennessee Gubernatorial Campaign and Election of 1894." Tennessee Historical Quarterly (1954): 99–126. in JSTOR
 McCormick, Richard L. From Realignment to Reform: Political Change in New York State 1893-1910 (1981).
 Petersen, Eric Falk. "The End of an Era: California's Gubernatorial Election of 1894." Pacific Historical Review 38.2 (1969): 141–156. in JSTOR

 
1894
United States midterm elections
November 1894 events